SS. Cyril and Methodius in Lemont - historic church of the Roman Catholic Archdiocese of Chicago, located in Lemont, Illinois.

It is a prime example of the so-called 'Polish Cathedral style'  of churches in both its opulence and grand scale.  Along with the Hindu Temple of Greater Chicago, it is one of the two monumental religious edifices that dominate the Lemont skyline.

History
Poles are noted in the Lemont area as early as 1860 working in the local quarries.  SS. Cyril and Methodius parish was founded in 1884 as a Polish parish.  The surrounding area was called Jasna Góra, in reverence to the shrine of the Black Madonna in Poland.  The parish offers mass in both Polish and English and is currently home to 1,965 families.

Architecture
The church was designed by Erhard Brielmaier, and sons, who are most well known for their design of the magnificent St. Josaphat Basilica in Milwaukee as well as the now closed parish of St. Salomea in Roseland.  The Romanesque style edifice was completed in 1929, replacing a former church that burned down in 1928.  Some of the church's highlights are the beautiful original rose window, the new entryway, and the church's steeple which is the highest elevation in all of Cook County, Illinois.

Patron saints
Cyril and Methodius were brothers born of Macedonian nobility, who became priests in Constantinople.  They evangelized to the Slavic peoples, translated the liturgy into Slavonic and made numerous converts.  They are also credited with devising and spreading the Glagolitic alphabet, which was used for Slavonic manuscripts before the development of the Cyrillic, the alphabet derived from Glagolitic, that, with small modifications, is still used in a number of Slavic languages.  Both brothers were canonized in The Eastern Orthodox Church as "equal-to-apostles".  In the Roman Catholic Church they are also jointly revered as Apostles to the Slavs and their cult was further glorified in 1980 when Pope John Paul II declared them the patron saints of Europe.

Church in architecture books

See also
Polish Cathedral style churches of Chicago
Polish Americans
Roman Catholicism in Poland

Roman Catholic churches in Illinois
Churches in Lemont, Illinois
Churches in the Roman Catholic Archdiocese of Chicago
Polish-American culture in Chicago
Polish Cathedral style architecture